Mayadykovo (Miäźek) is a rural locality (a selo) and the administrative centre of Mayadykovsky Selsoviet, Birsky District, Bashkortostan, Russia. The population was 252 as of 2010. There are 5 streets.

Geography 
Mayadykovo is located 36 km southwest of Birsk (the district's administrative centre) by road. Shelkanovo is the nearest rural locality.

References 

Rural localities in Birsky District